Fruit in the Neighbour's Garden is a 1935 German comedy film directed by Erich Engels and starring Karl Valentin, Liesl Karlstadt and Adele Sandrock. It was shot at the Bavaria Studios in Munich with sets designed by the art directors Paul Markwitz and Heinrich Richter. Engels later remade the film in 1956.

Plot 
Hofrat Warrenheim, a passionate plant lover, moves with his daughter Hansi and his gardener Valentin, with the help of the chance acquaintance Theo, who is interested in Hansi, into the house next door to the animal lover Adele Hecht and her maid Lisl. According to Adele, this property was actually intended for her step-niece Irma and her potential fiancé Theo. You get along quite well at the beginning, even play skat together and greet each other at breakfast outdoors. However, when Adele's poultry, who allegedly own a Siamese duck with which she would like to start breeding and which lays only one egg a year, eats Warrenheim's plants, a neighborhood dispute begins, especially since gardener Valentin takes the duck's egg, which had just been laid on the property line, to breakfast served. In the course of the dispute, they insult each other and each seek a lawsuit in court.

Hansi and Theo (who is actually supposed to be engaged to his cousin Irma according to the wishes of his aunt Adele), who have since become closer, are separated by a misunderstanding (his friend Gottfried had left Theo's motorbike without him to accompany Irma after a dance evening together borrowed knowledge and received a ticket). On the way to the atonement date through the local teacher, Theo learns about this motorcycle story.

The appointment, which was moved to the classroom because of the large number of witnesses, begins turbulently with mutual accusations. Theo can win back his Hansi through an unrelated contribution. When the lay judge seems desperate, the duck he has brought lays another egg, which is generally regarded as a miracle and contributes to the general reconciliation. Three couples leave the room: Adele and Warrenheim, Theo and Hansi, and Lisl and Valentin.

Cast
 Adele Sandrock as Adele Hecht
 Theo Shall as Theo, ihr Neffe
 Liesl Karlstadt as Liesl, ihre Magd
 Max Gülstorff as Warrenheim, Hofrat a.D.
 Iris Arlan as Hansi, seine Tochter
 Karl Valentin as Valentin, sein Gärtner
 Reinhold Bernt as Gottfried Berger, Theos Freund
 Rotraut Richter as Irma Fiedler
 Albert Florath as Anton Huber, Lehrer
 Hedi Höpfner as Tanzpaar
 Margot Höpfner as Tanzpaar
 Victor Schamoni as Kind

References

Bibliography 
 Klaus, Ulrich J. Deutsche Tonfilme: Jahrgang 1933. Klaus-Archiv, 1988.

External links 
 

1935 films
1935 comedy films
German comedy films
Films of Nazi Germany
1930s German-language films
Films directed by Erich Engels
German black-and-white films
Terra Film films
1930s German films
Films shot at Bavaria Studios